Renewal Christian Centre is a large family church established and primarily based in Solihull, England. The church belongs to the Free Methodist Church of Great Britain.

The congregation was founded in 1972 and has grown to over 2,000 weekly attendees.

The church also operates and has additional facilities throughout the West Midlands, with services also taking place in Stratford-Upon-Avon, Chelmsley Wood and Wroxall.

Facilities
The church's main base is in Solihull, West Midlands, but it also operates and has facilities in Stratford-Upon-Avon, Chelmsley Wood and Wroxall.

Solihull 
The church holds two services on a Sunday at 10am and 12pm. It runs many community activities throughout the week, as well as having a large children's and youth ministry. The Renewal Family Centre was opened in 2008 and offers a coffee shop and facilities for a range of community activities.

Stratford-Upon-Avon 
The church holds one service on a Sunday at 10.30am and meets at Stratford-Upon-Avon College.

Chelmsley Wood 
The church was given a permanent building on Walnut Close, Chelmsley Wood. This building was eventually knocked down and rebuilt into a brand new family centre, opening its doors in October 2016. The church holds one service on a Sunday at 11am. It also offers a coffee shop and facilities for a range of community activities throughout the week.

Wroxall 
The church meets every Sunday at 4pm for a traditional service at Wren's Cathedral on the Wroxall Abbey Estate. On the first Sunday of the month a short communion service is held at 3:30pm before the main service.

External links
Renewal Christian Centre, Solihull website

Solihull
Solihull
Christian organizations established in 1972
Free Methodist Church
20th-century Methodist church buildings